Kevin Anderson and Ryler DeHeart were the defending champions but decided not to participate.
Ryan Harrison and Travis Rettenmaier won the final against Robert Kendrick and Alex Kuznetsov who withdrew before the match.

Seeds

Draw

Draw

References
 Doubles Draw

Honolulu Challenger - Doubles
2011 Doubles